The Maui News is a Wailuku, Hawaii based, daily newspaper covering the islands of Maui, Lanai and Molokai. The Maui News began publication on February 17, 1900. Henry Perrine Baldwin became an owner of the News in 1905. The Maui News was sold to Ogden Newspapers by Baldwin's descendants on February 1, 2000.

References

External links
 The Maui News website
 The Maui News issues from February 17, 1900 to December 29, 1922 on Chronicling America

Newspapers published in Hawaii
Maui
1900 establishments in Hawaii
Newspapers established in 1900
2000 mergers and acquisitions